Motorcycle sport is a broad field that encompasses all sporting aspects of motorcycling. The disciplines are not all races or timed-speed events, as several disciplines test a competitor's various riding skills.

Motorcycle racing

Motorcycle racing (also known as moto racing and motorbike racing) is a motorcycle sport involving racing motorcycles. Motorcycle racing can be divided into two categories, tarmac-based road disciplines and off-road.

Track racing

Track racing is a motorcycle sport where teams or individuals race opponents around an oval track. There are differing variants, with each variant racing on a different surface type.

Rally 

A road rally is a navigation event on public roads whereby competitors must visit a number of checkpoints in diverse geographical locations while still obeying road traffic laws (not to be confused with car rallies such as WRC).

Speedway

Speedway is a motorcycle sport in which the motorcycles have one gear and no brakes.

Other Motorcycle sports

Land speed

The rider must exceed the previous top speed record for that class or type of bike for their name to be placed on the record books. See— for an example.

Enduro

Enduro is not exactly racing, because the main objective is to traverse a series of checkpoints, arriving exactly "on time" in accordance with your beginning time and the time it is supposed to take to arrive at each checkpoint. The courses are usually run over thick wooded terrain, sometimes with large obstacles such as logs, ditches, and sudden drops.

Freestyle Motocross

A competition based upon points for acrobatic ability on an MX bike over jumps. This activity evolved from Motocross a continuing popular form of racing at both the Amateur and Professional levels.

Trials

Known in the US as Observed Trials, it is not racing, but a sport nevertheless. Trials is a test of skill on a motorcycle whereby the rider attempts to traverse an observed section without placing a foot on the ground (and traditionally, although not always, without ceasing forward motion). The winner is the rider with the least penalty points.

Time and observation
Time and observation trials are trials with a time limit. The person who completes the route the quickest sets the "standard time" and all other competitors must finish within a certain amount of time of the standard time to be counted as a finisher (they received penalty points for every minute after the quickest finisher). This is combined with the penalty points accrued from the observed sections to arrive at a winner, who is not alway the quickest rider or the rider who lost the less marks on observation but the rider who balanced these competing demands the best. One of the most famous time and observation trials is the "Scott" trial held annually in North Yorkshire.

Indoor trials
Indoor trials held in stadiums (not necessarily with a roof) which by their very nature use man-made artificial sections in contrast to outdoor trials which rely heavily on the natural terrain.

Long distance trials

Long Distance Trials (often shortened to 'LDT') in the UK are events for road-registered motorcycles.  A course of typically 80 to 120 miles is plotted by the organiser, taking in roads, lanes and Byways Open to All Traffic (known as BOATs).  The event is not a race and riders are required to follow the course by using a RoadBook compiled by the organiser.

Motorcycle Gymkhana

Similar to car Autocross, Motorcycle Gymkhana is a motorcycle time trial sport round cones on a paved area. The winner is the competitor who completes the course in the shortest time. Time penalties are incurred by putting a foot down, hitting a cone, or going outside the designated area.

Motoball (Motorcycle Polo) 

Similar to football, but all players (except goalkeepers) are riding motorcycles, and the ball is much bigger. Motorcycle Polo first began as an officially organized sport in the mid-1930s. In France, there are organized motoball competitions, and the sport was included in the inaugural Goodwill Games.

Hill Climbs 
In the United States the completions are usually held on off-road courses, where one competitor at a time attempts to ride up a very steep hill, often 45 degrees or more. In some cases, few riders actually complete the course and results are judged on the distance that they manage to achieve. Of those that do complete the course, the rider to reach the top with the shortest elapsed time wins.  The motorcycle of choice in the early decades was the Harley-Davidson 45 cubic inch model due to its high torque at low rpms, similar to farm engines. For years the national competitions was held at Mount Garfield near Muskegon, Michigan.

In other countries, notably the United Kingdom, completions mostly take place on tarmac courses, occasionally closed public roads, with the machines used for competition being similar to those used for other road disciplines.

References

External links 

Sanctioning bodies

 Fédération Internationale de Motocyclisme (FIM) – World governing body
 Motorcycling Australia (MA) – Australian Governing Body
 Auto Cycle Union – UK governing body
 American Motorcyclist Association (AMA) – US governing body
 Motorcycle Federation of Japan (MFJ) – Japan governing body
 Motosport South Africa (MSA) – South African governing body
 Federation Francaise de moto (FFM) – French governing body
 MCUI Southern Centre – "governing body of motor cycle sport in Leinster, Munster and Connacht" (i.e., Republic of Ireland)
 Championship Cup Series – Sanctioning body for Sportsman Level motorcycle road racing in the United States